Gianius is a genus of annelids belonging to the family Naididae.

The species of this genus are found in Europe and Northern America.

Species:

Gianius anatolicus 
Gianius aquaedulcis 
Gianius cavealis 
Gianius cristolatus 
Gianius crypticus 
Gianius densespectinis 
Gianius eximius 
Gianius labouichensis 
Gianius monnioti 
Gianius navarroi 
Gianius riparius

References

Annelids
Taxa named by Christer Erséus